Routsi (Greek: Ρούτσι) is a village in the northern part of the municipal unit of Falaisia, Arcadia, Greece. It is situated in the wooded hills 8 km southeast of Megalopoli, 3 km northwest of Voutsaras, 3 km southwest of Anemodouri, 4 km south of Rapsommatis, 5 km northeast of Leontari. The railway from Corinth to Kalamata passes south of the village.

Population

See also
List of settlements in Arcadia

References

External links
 University of Patras on Routsi

Falaisia
Populated places in Arcadia, Peloponnese